The Best Actress Award is an award presented at the Cannes Film Festival since 1946. It is given to an actress who has delivered an outstanding performance and chosen by the jury from the films in official competition slate at the festival. 

At the 1st Cannes Film Festival held in 1946, Michèle Morgan was the first winner of this award for her performance in Pastoral Symphony, and Zar Amir Ebrahimi is the most recent winner in this category for her role in Holy Spider at the 75th Cannes Film Festival in 2022.

History
The award was first presented in 1946. The prize was not awarded on three occasions (1947, 1953, and 1954). The festival was not held at all in 1948, 1950, and 2020. In 1968, no awards were given as the festival was called off mid-way due to the May 1968 events in France. On four occasions, the jury has awarded multiple women (more than 2) the prize for one film. The four films were A Big Family (1955), Brink of Life (1958), A World Apart (1988), and Volver (2006). Vanessa Redgrave, Barbara Hershey, Helen Mirren, and Isabelle Huppert have won the most awards in this category, each winning twice. Hershey is the only actress to win the award in consecutive years, for Shy People (1987) and A World Apart (1988). Isabelle Adjani is the only actress to win the award for two different films in the same competition, for her roles in Possession and Quartet 
(1981). The award can be for lead or supporting roles, with the exception of the period from 1979 to 1981, when the festival used to award a separate "Best Supporting Actress" prize. The jury also, on occasion, cites actresses with a special citation that is separate from the main award.

Winners

Multiple winners 

The following individuals have received multiple Best Actress awards:

See also 
The following individuals have also received Best Actress award(s) at Venice or Berlin Film Festival.

Notes

A: This year the award was changed to Prix d'Interpretation (Acting Award), without gender differentiation. 
B: The entire male and female cast of A Big Family (Больша́я семья́) was recipient of this award in a tie with Spencer Tracy for Bad Day at Black Rock.
C: This year award was given as Prix collectif d'interprétation féminine Un Certain Regard (Collective Female Acting Award - Un Certain Regard) to the female cast of Brink of Life (Nära livet).
D: This year award was given as Prix Le Premier Regard Un Certain Regard (Premiere Award - Un Certain Regard) to the lead male and female cast of Long Day's Journey into Night and A Taste of Honey (ex aequo).
E: Performer to receive a single award which honor the outstanding work in multiple different films in the same official competition slate.

References

External links
 Cannes Film Festival official website
 Cannes Film Festival at IMDb .

Cannes Film Festival
 
Awards for actresses
Film awards for lead actress
Film awards for supporting actress
Cannes, Best Actress